The men's doubles table tennis event at the 2019 Pan American Games will be held from August 4 – 6 at the Polideportivo 3 in Lima, Peru..

Results

Draw

References

External links
Draw results

Men's doubles